Emine Nur Günay (born 13 August 1962,in Eskişehir , Turkey) is a Turkish economist and politician and member of Turkish Parliament, and a member of the Justice and development party in Turkey and Deputy of Eskişehir

References 

Living people
1962 births
People from Eskişehir